Sciopèn (also known as Chopin) is a 1982 Italian comedy film directed by Luciano Odorisio. The film entered the competition at the 39th Venice Film Festival, in which it won the Silver Lion for best first work. Odorisio was awarded best new director at the San Sebastián International Film Festival, while Tino Schirinzi won a Silver Ribbon for best supporting actor.

Plot 
In Abruzzo, in the town of Chieti, a group of friends workers, with the passion of classical music, try to rebuild a historic city orchestra, which no longer exists. The final concert provides only compositions the famous composer Frédéric Chopin, and the citizens of Chieti seem willing to finance the project. However, the mayor and local officials are skeptical, because the think only to their interests. So the project soon failed, but the workers come from defeat with a smile.

Cast 
Michele Placido: Francesco Maria Vitale
Giuliana De Sio: Marta Vitale
Adalberto Maria Merli: Andrea Serano
Guido Celano: Cesare Serano '’zio Cesarin'’
Tino Schirinzi: Nicolino
Fabio Traversa: Vittorio
Lino Troisi: Lawyer Gianni D'Angelo
Anna Bonaiuto: Laura Serano

See also       
 List of Italian films of 1982

References

External links

1982 films
Italian comedy films
1982 comedy films
Films directed by Luciano Odorisio
1980s Italian-language films
1980s Italian films